Long River is an unincorporated community, in Queens County. Long River is in Lot 20 of Statistics Canada

Climate

See also 
List of communities in Prince Edward Island

References 

Communities in Queens County, Prince Edward Island